Ionuț Sebastian Cojocaru (born 28 July 2003) is a Romanian professional footballer who plays as a winger for Liga I side Farul Constanța.

Early life

Cojocaru was born in 2003.

Club career

Farul Constanța

Cojocaru starte his career with Farul Constanța.

He made his league debut on 6 February 2023 in Liga I match against CS Universitatea Craiova.

Career statistics

Club

References

External links
 
 Ionuț Cojocaru at lpf.ro

2003 births
Living people
Sportspeople from Brăila
Romanian footballers
Romania youth international footballers
Association football midfielders
Liga I players
FCV Farul Constanța players